Ica von Lenkeffy (born Ilona Kaukál; 25 October 1896 – 25 January 1955) was a Hungarian film actress of the silent era. She appeared in 26 films between 1912 and 1928. She was born in Miskolc, Hungary and died in Budapest.

Partial filmography
 A Vörös Sámson (1917)
 Tavasz a télben (1917)
 A Senki fia (1917)
 St. Peter's Umbrella (1917)
 A Kuruzsló (1917)
 Sulamith (1917)
 Mary Ann (1918)
 Faun (1918)
 Liliom (1919)
 Man of Gold (1919)
 The Inheritance of Tordis (1921)
 Othello (1922)
 Miss Madame (1923)
 Yvette (1928)

External links

1896 births
1955 deaths
Hungarian film actresses
Hungarian silent film actresses
20th-century Hungarian actresses